KIC 10001893 (Kepler-429) is a subdwarf B star with 3 possible exoplanets, but they probably do not exist. They were detected by orbital brightness modulation.

References

B-type subdwarfs
Kepler objects of interest
Lyra (constellation)